Moinuddin Aqeel (Urdu: معین الدین عقیل) (born 25 June 1946) is an author, critic being a scholar of Urdu literature and [from Pakistan, who served the University of Karachi as Professor and chairman of Urdu department. He also remained Director of the Bureau of Composition, Compilation and Translation, University of Karachi. Besides University of Karachi, Dr. Aqeel taught Urdu at the Tokyo University of Foreign Studies, Japan and University of Oriental Studies, Naples, Italy for several years. He also gave weekly extension lectures at the Daito Bunka University, Saitama, Japan on Pakistan's culture and history. He is currently Dean of the Faculty of Languages and Literature and has served as Chairman of the Department of Urdu at International Islamic University, Islamabad.

Education
DLitt, 2003, University of Karachi.
PhD on The Role of Urdu in the Freedom Movement, 1975, University of Karachi.
M.A., 1969, University of Karachi.

Positions held

Head Examiner, (Urdu), International Baccalaurate Organisation, Cardiff, UK (2001 to date).
Director of the Bureau of Composition, Compilation and Translation, University of Karachi (2002 to July 2003).
Director, Evening Programme, University of Karachi (July 2003 to January 2004).
chairman, Department of Urdu, University of Karachi.(retired in 2006)

Awards and recognition

Best Teacher, Allama Iqbal Open University, 1989.
Ba Ba-e-Urdu Gold Medal, 1969.

Aqeel became subject of study as follows:

MPhil, Farhat Sultana, Urdu Services of Prof. Moinuddin Aqeel, Osmania University, Deccan, India, 2003.
M.A., Shumaila Fareed, Educational and Literary Services of Dr. Moinuddin Aqeel, University of Sindh, Jamshoro, Pakistan, 1997.
M.A., Saima Rani, Standing of Dr. Moinuddin Aqeel in Urdu Research and Critique, Bahauddin Zakaria University, Multan, Pakistan, 2003.

Life and career

Aqeel was born in India and after partition, came to Pakistan. He has taught for more than 30 years at the university level and supervised many students for their M.Phil. and PhD degrees. He has written 37 books, 200 research articles/reviews/preface etc. and has visited nearly 40 countries . His personal library contains more than 30,000 books.

Books

 Raft O Bood-Autobiography of Dr Abul Lais Siddiqui-Edited By Dr Moinuddin Aqeel-2011-Karachi-Title page of Raft O Bood has been added by Rashid Ashraf in external link
Tazkirah Ulma-e-Sitapur, 2006, Karachi.
Resurgence of Muslim Separatism in British India: A selection of unpublished correspondence between Jinnah and Mir Ghulam Bhik Nairang, 2001, Lahore.
Pakistani Adab; Masail aur Manazir, 1999, Lahore.
Fatah Nama-e-Tipu Sultan, 1999, Lahore.
Kalimat-e-Aabdar, 1999, Karachi.
Beyaz-e-Ranjoor, 1998, Patna, India.
Peraya-e-Urdu (4th part), 1998, Tokyo University of Foreign Studies, Tokyo.
Peraya-e-Urdu (3rd part), 1998, Tokyo University of Foreign Studies, Tokyo.
Jihat-e-Jehd-e-Azadi, 1998, Lahore.
Saqoot-e-Hyderabad, 1998, Karachi.
Nawadrat-e-Adab, 1997, Lahore.
Ameer Khusro: fard aur tareekh, 1997, Karachi.
Pakistani Ghazal, 1997, Karachi.
Peraya-e-Urdu (2nd part), 1998, Tokyo University of Foreign Studies, Tokyo.
Peraya-e-Urdu (1st part), 1998, Tokyo University of Foreign Studies, Tokyo.
Urdu ki awwaleen niswani khud nawisht, 1996, Hyderabad, Sindh.
Pakistan Mein Urdu Adab, 1996, Karachi.
Kalam-e-Ranjoor Faizabadi, 1996, Patna, India.
Iqbal: from finite to infinite, 1996, Karachi.
Deccan ka ehd-e-Islami, 1994, Karachi.
Madh aur Qadh-e-Deccan, 1994, Karachi.
Tehreek-e-Pakistan ka Taleemi Pas-Manzar, 1992, Lahore.
Tehreek-e-Azadi aur Mumlikat-e-Hyderabad, 1990, Karachi.
Muntakhibat-e-Akhbar-e-Urdu, 1988, Islamabad.
Muntakhibat-e- Urdu Nama, 1988, Islamabad.
Pakistan Mein Urdu Tehqeeq; Mozuaat aur Mayaar, 1987, Karachi.
Dr. Ishtiaq Hussain Qureshi; Kitabiyat, 1987, Islamabad.
Iqbal aur Jadeed Dunya-e-Islam, 1986, Lahore.
Ikhlaqi Taleem, 1986, Jamshoro.
Deccan aur Iran, 1983, Karachi.
Aik Nadir Safarnama; Deccan, 1982, Karachi.
Pakistan Mein Urdu Ghazal, 1982, Ranchi, India.
Kalam-e-Nairang, 1982, Karachi.
Musslamanoun Ki Jidd-o-Jehd-e-Azadi, 1982, Lahore.
Isharea Kalam-e-Faiz, 1978, Delhi.
Tehreek-e-Azadi Mein Urdu Ka Hissa, 1972, Karachi.
Tehreek-e-Pakistan Aur Maulana Maududi, 1971, Karachi.

References

 Press release
 Dawn newspaper articles 
 The story of destruction caused by the bomb Dawn. 5 September 2006. Retrieved 6 February 2023
 The News International
 Daily Times
 Nairang Foundation
 Press release 
 Raft o Bood Dr Abulais Siddiqui 

Living people
Urdu-language non-fiction writers
Pakistani literary critics
Urdu critics
University of Karachi alumni
1946 births
Academic staff of the International Islamic University, Islamabad
Academic staff of the University of Karachi
Writers from Karachi
Academic staff of Daito Bunka University
Academic staff of Tokyo University of Foreign Studies